Sidorovskoye is a rural locality (a village) in Rostilovskoye Rural Settlement, Gryazovetsky District, Vologda Oblast, Russia. The population was 142 as of 2002. There are 2 streets.

Geography 
Sidorovskoye is located 23 km south of Gryazovets (the district's administrative centre) by road. Martyakovo is the nearest rural locality.

References 

Rural localities in Gryazovetsky District